The 1965 Campeonato Ecuatoriano de Fútbol was the 7th national championship for football teams in Ecuador. Emelec won their third national title. They qualified to the 1966 Copa Libertadores along with 9 de Octubre.

Qualified teams
The number of teams remained the same at eight. The qualified teams included the top-four finishers from the Campeonato Interandino and the Campeonato de Guayaquil. Universidad Católica made their first appearance in the tournament.

Standings

Results

Runner-up playoff
Since 9 de Octubre, Barcelona, and Patria finished the tournament equal on points, a playoff was needed to determine who finished as the runner-up and qualified to the 1966 Copa Libertadores. Patria declined to participate. After tying at a goal apiece, 9 de Octubre was declared the runner-up since they had a better goal average throughout the season (1.37 v. 1.36).

References

Ecuadorian Serie A seasons
1965 in Ecuadorian sport
Ecuador